Giacomo Merculiano (Naples, September 29, 1859 - November, 1935) was an Italian sculptor, medallist, and illustrator.

He studied at the Institute of Fine Arts in Naples, where he first gained recognition for a stucco statue titled Aspiration, exhibited at the Promotrice of Naples. In 1889 at the same Exhibition, he displayed a bronze statuette titled Canto fermo. He completed the bronze bust for the funereal monument of Count Giulio di Conversano in Camposanto di Naples.

While Merculiano also dabbled in painting, sculpture was his main output. By 1900, he was living in Paris, France, and would sign his works Jacques Merculiano or J. Merculiano. He focused mainly on depictions of animals. He exhibited from 1914 on in the Salon in Paris.

References
 

1859 births
1935 deaths
20th-century Italian sculptors
20th-century Italian male artists
19th-century Italian sculptors
Italian male sculptors
Italian painters of animals
19th-century Italian male artists